The Penang General Hospital is the oldest historical and largest public hospital is since 1854, in the city of George Town in Penang, Malaysia. The largest public hospital in Penang, it also serves as the reference hospital within northern Malaysia.

The hospital had its origins as a medical centre founded in 1854 for the poor and opium addicts.

History
The hospital land was given to the British Malaya government in 1882 for them to construct a hospital. In 1930, the nurse dormitory was constructed. In 1935, block A and block C of the hospital were constructed. In 1939, the maternity hospital was constructed. In 1989, the central administration center blocks were constructed.

Architecture
 Block A
 Block B
 Block C

See also
 List of hospitals in Malaysia
 Healthcare in Malaysia

References

External links

  

1882 establishments in British Malaya
Hospitals established in 1882
Hospitals in Penang